Ragnhild Andenæs (born 28 September 1977) is a Norwegian fencer. She competed in the women's individual and team épée events at the 2000 Summer Olympics.

References

External links
 

1977 births
Living people
Norwegian female épée fencers
Olympic fencers of Norway
Fencers at the 2000 Summer Olympics
Sportspeople from Oslo